The Pointe Sud de Moming (3,963 m) is a mountain of the Swiss Pennine Alps, located west of Täsch in the canton of Valais. It lies on the range between the Weisshorn and the Zinalrothorn, south of the Col de Moming.

See also
Pointe Nord de Moming

References

External links
 Pointe Sud de Moming on Hikr

Mountains of the Alps
Alpine three-thousanders
Mountains of Valais
Mountains of Switzerland
Three-thousanders of Switzerland